Hetaira  (plural hetairai, also hetaera  (plural hetaerae ), ("companion", pl. Unlike the rule for ancient Greek women, hetairas would be highly educated and were allowed in the symposium.

Summary

Traditionally, historians of ancient Greece have distinguished between hetairai and pornai, another class of prostitute in ancient Greece. In contrast to pornai, who provided sex for numerous clients in brothels or on the street, hetairai were thought to have had only a few men as clients at any one time, to have had long-term relationships with them, and to have provided companionship and intellectual stimulation as well as sex. For instance, Charles Seltman wrote in 1953 that "hetaeras were certainly in a very different class, often highly educated women".

More recently, however, historians have questioned the extent to which there was really a distinction between hetairai and pornai. The second edition of the Oxford Classical Dictionary, for instance, held that hetaira was a euphemism for any kind of prostitute. This position is supported by Konstantinos Kapparis, who holds that Apollodorus' famous tripartite division of the types of women in the speech Against Neaera ("We have courtesans for pleasure, concubines for the daily tending of the body, and wives in order to beget legitimate children and have a trustworthy guardian of what is at home.") classes all prostitutes together, under the term hetairai.

A third position, advanced by Rebecca Futo Kennedy, suggests that hetairai "were not prostitutes or even courtesans". Instead, she argues, hetairai were "elite women ... who participated in sympotic and luxury culture", just as hetairoi – the masculine form of the word – was used to refer to groups of elite men at symposia.

Even when the term hetaira was used to refer to a specific class of prostitute, though, scholars disagree on what precisely the line of demarcation was. Kurke emphasises that hetairai veiled the fact that they were selling sex through the language of gift-exchange, while pornai explicitly commodified sex. Leslie Kurke claims that both hetairai and pornai could be slaves or free, and might or might not work for a pimp. Kapparis says that hetairai were high-class prostitutes, and cites Dover as pointing to the long-term nature of hetairai's relationships with individual men. Miner disagrees with Kurke, claiming that hetairai were always free, not slaves.

Along with sexual services, women described as hetairai rather than pornai seem to have often been educated, and have provided companionship.  According to Kurke, the concept of hetairism was a product of the symposium, where hetairai were permitted as sexually available companions of the male party-goers. In Athenaeus' Deipnosophistai, hetairai are described as providing "flattering and skillful conversation": something which is, elsewhere in classical literature, seen as a significant part of the hetaira's role. Particularly, "witty" and "refined" were seen as attributes which distinguished hetairai from common pornai. Hetairai are likely to have been musically educated, too.

Free hetairai could become very wealthy, and control their own finances. However, their careers could be short, and if they did not earn enough to support themselves, they might have been forced to resort to working in brothels, or working as pimps, in order to ensure a continued income as they got older.

See also 
 Aspasia: common law wife of Pericles, sometimes alleged to have been a hetaira
 Oiran: class of courtesans in Edo period and Imperial Japan
 Qayna: class of courtesans in pre-modern Islamic world
 Phryne: famed hetaira tried for impiety
 Prostitution in ancient Rome
 Thaïs: hetaira of Ptolemy I Soter

References

Further reading 

 
 An essay on women’s lives in classical Athens
 The hetaerae of Athens - from Book 13 of Athenaeus

Prostitution in ancient Greece
 
Sexuality in ancient Greece
Obsolete occupations
Courtesans by type
Women in ancient Greece